The Chambal Garden is located in southeastern Rajasthan, India on the banks of the Chambal River in the town of Kota (once part of the Rajput kingdom).

The well-groomed garden's centerpiece is a pond replete with gharials, which used to house magars as well. The pond can be crossed via a suspension bridge or by boat to allow a closeup view of the fish-eating reptiles.

The garden draws large number of couples . The garden has also a toy train which gives the complete tour of the garden. The garden is a good place for  persons who like boating and want to spend a quality time in solitudeness.

Some scenes of the 2017 Bollywood film Badrinath Ki Dulhania were also shot here.

References

External links
 Chambal Garden website

Gardens in Rajasthan
Tourist attractions in Kota, Rajasthan